Jorge Quiroga assumed office as the 62nd President of Bolivia on 7 August 2001, and his term ended on 6 August 2002. Having previously served as vice president, Quiroga assumed the presidency after the resignation for health reasons by President Hugo Banzer and was tasked with fulfilling the final 364 days of Banzer's term.

The majority of the fourth Banzer ministerial cabinet, save for two ministers, resigned along with Banzer on 7 August 2001 allowing Jorge Quiroga to form his first ministerial cabinet the following day on 8 August. Quiroga would form his second cabinet on 5 March 2002. Quiroga's first and second ministerial cabinets comprised the 202nd and 203rd national cabinets of Bolivia.

Cabinet Ministers

Composition 
The composition of Quiroga's first cabinet was described as "mixed" by ANF. Of the 15 ministers, six were "pseudo-independents". Minister of the Presidency José Luis Lupo Flores was an independent with links to the Revolutionary Left Movement (MIR) while Finance Minister Jacques Trigo Loubiere had been Superintendent of Banks for the Revolutionary Nationalist (MNR) government of Gonzalo Sánchez de Lozada. Ministers Carlos Kempff Bruno, Walter Nuñez-Rodriguez, and Ramiro Cavero were new political figures though with noted inclinations towards Quiroga's Nationalsit Democratic Action (ADN) party.

The remaining ministers were predominantly members of either the ADN or MIR which had been political allies since the mid-1980s. Minister of Health Enrique Paz Argandoña was notably the nephew of former MIR President Jaime Paz Zamora. Leopoldo Fernández had been President of the Chamber of Senators prior to his appointment as Minister of Government. The Quiroga cabinet was also significant in that many political "dinosaurs" were relieved of their positions in favor of younger ministers. Among ADN officials, it was commented that the "withdrawal of the dinos is total" as the only remaining so-called dino was Minister of Justice Mario Serrate who at any time could be (and indeed in 2002 was) removed by Quiroga.

The appointment of Tomasa Yarhui as Minister Without Portfolio Responsible for Peasant Affairs and Indigenous Peoples as part of the second Quiroga cabinet was of particular note due to the fact that Yarhui was the first indigenous government minister in Bolivian history. Yarhui would by Quiroga's running mate in his second attempt to win a full term during the 2014 general elections.

Notes

References

Bibliography 
 

Cabinets of Bolivia
Cabinets established in 2001
Cabinets disestablished in 2002